Canadian Colonial Airways was founded in 1929 in Montreal, Quebec, Canada.  In 1942, it reformed as Colonial Airlines, which was later absorbed by Eastern Air Lines.

Cities Served

Albany, New York
Buffalo, New York
Montreal, Quebec, Canada
Newark, New Jersey
Ottawa, Ontario, Canada
Toronto, Ontario, Canada
Troy, New York

See also 
 List of defunct airlines of Canada

References

Defunct airlines of Canada
Airlines established in 1929
Airlines disestablished in 1942
1929 establishments in Quebec
Canadian companies established in 1929
1942 disestablishments in Quebec